Bennati is an Italian surname. Notable people with the surname include:

Adam Bennati, American musician
Daniele Bennati (born 1980), Italian cyclist 
Giuseppe Bennati (1921–2006), Italian film director and writer

Italian-language surnames